Farsi is the indigenous name or endonym for Persian. It primarily refers to the Persian language.

Farsi may also refer to:
something referring to or inhabitant of Fars Province, Iran
Persian people
Farsi, Afghanistan
Farsi District in Herat province, Afghanistan
Farsi Island, an Iranian island off the coast of Fars, Iran
Farsi village, located in Hormozgan province, Iran
Farsi1, a Persian-language TV channel

See also
 Persia (disambiguation)
 Persian (disambiguation)
 Iranian (disambiguation)
 Parsi (disambiguation)

Iranian-language surnames